Prefetching in computer science is a technique for speeding up fetch operations by beginning a fetch operation whose result is expected to be needed soon.  Usually this is before it is known to be needed, so there is a risk of wasting time by prefetching data that will not be used.  The technique can be applied in several circumstances:

 Cache prefetching, a speedup technique used by computer processors where instructions or data are fetched before they are needed
 Prefetch input queue (PIQ), in computer architecture, pre-loading machine code from memory
 Link prefetching, a web mechanism for prefetching links
 Prefetcher technology in modern releases of Microsoft Windows
 prefetch instructions, for example provided by
 PREFETCH, an X86 instruction in computing
 Prefetch buffer, a feature of DDR SDRAM memory
 Swap prefetch, in computer operating systems, anticipatory paging

See also

Computer science